The Uganda Ministry of East African Community Affairs is a cabinet level-ministry headed by Minister Kahinda Otafiire.

Location
The headquarters of the ministry are on the second and ninth floors of the Postel Building, at 67–75 Yusuf Lule Road in the Central Division of Kampala, Uganda's capital and largest city.

Overview
The ministry was created in 2007 with the major objective of coordinating the affairs of the government of Uganda with the East African Community, which includes Burundi, Kenya, Rwanda, South Sudan, and Tanzania. One objective of the treaty establishing the East African Community consists of the:

 establishment of a customs union
 establishment of a common market
 subsequent creation of a monetary union
 eventual formation of a political federation

List of ministers
 Rebecca Kadaga (8 June 2021 - present)
 Kahinda Otafiire (14 December 2019 - 8 June 2021)
 Kirunda Kivejinja (6 June 2016 - 14 December 2019)
 Shem Bageine (2 March 2013 - 6 June 2016)
 Eriya Kategaya (2007 - 2 March 2013)

See also
Government of Uganda
Cabinet of Uganda

References

External links
 Website of the Ministry of East African Community Affairs

Government ministries of Uganda
East African Community
Organisations based in Kampala
2007 establishments in Uganda